The Ambassador Permanent Representative of Spain to the United Nations is an official of the Government of Spain belonging to the diplomatic corps representing Spain before the United Nations (UN) based in New York City, United States. This permanent representation, unlike the Permanent Representation of Spain to the European Union, does not have its own legislation and is regulated by the general regulations governing diplomatic missions, by international law and by the internal law of the UN.

The Permanent Mission, which is organizationally and functionally dependent on the Ministry of Foreign Affairs, represents the State Administration as a whole, is the superior head of all the personnel of the Mission or Representation, directs the same and coordinates the External Action and the Foreign Service of the State at the UN.

The United Nations has several headquarters in different countries. This position should not be confused with that of Ambassador Permanent Representative of Spain to the United Nations Office and International Organizations based in Vienna and Ambassador Permanent Representative of Spain to the United Nations Office and International Organizations based in Geneva.

Origin

The Permanent Representative of Spain to the United Nations was approved by the Council of Ministers on December 23, 1955, and came into force on January 1 of the following year. This representative assumes the representation of Spain at the headquarters of the United Nations Organization in New York and all its organs, as a consequence of the country's entry into the organization on December 14, 1955.

Permanent Mission of Spain to the United Nations

The Permanent Mission of Spain to the United Nations is the organization within the Foreign Service in charge of representing Spain before the UN and defending its interests and those of its citizens. It is also in charge of developing international relations with the UN, conducting the necessary negotiations and cooperating with the European External Action Service for the promotion and defense of the interests of the Union.

The Permanent Mission consists of the Permanent Representative Ambassador, the Deputy Permanent Representative Ambassador and the Chancery. In addition, it is also made up of Councils, Attaché Offices, Sectoral Offices, Economic and Commercial Offices, Technical Cooperation Offices, Cultural Centers, Spanish Cooperation Training Centers, as well as the Cervantes Institute and, where appropriate, the Common Services Section.

It works in close collaboration with the Secretary of State for Foreign Affairs and the Directorate General for the United Nations and Human Rights.

Ambassadors

For all ambassadors, see Annex:Permanent Representatives of Spain to the United Nations.

Office holders

See also
Spain and the United Nations
Foreign relations of Spain

References

External links
Actualidad ONU - Permanent Mission of Spain to the United Nations

Foreign relations of Spain
Permanent Representatives of Spain to the United Nations
Spain
United Nations